Jeremy Diamond is an American journalist who works as the White House correspondent for CNN.

Early life 

Diamond attended the French American School of New York from the age of 3 through his graduation from high school in 2011 where he worked at the school newspaper. In December 2014, he graduated cum laude with a B.A. in international affairs from George Washington University. At George Washington, he worked as the news editor at The GW Hatchet and won the Institute on Political Journalism's Collegiate Journalism Award and a Pinnacle Award from the College Media Association.

Career 

After school, he worked as an intern at CNN before becoming a reporter in September 2014. His career has been dedicated to following the election campaign and presidency of Donald Trump. He currently works as a White House Correspondent.

Personal life 

Diamond is fluent in French and conversational in Spanish and Hebrew. He lives in Washington D.C. with his partner, NBC political correspondent, Ali Vitali.

References

External links 

 

CNN people
Elliott School of International Affairs alumni
Living people
Lycée Français de New York alumni
Year of birth missing (living people)